Sea air has traditionally been thought to offer health benefits associated with its unique odor, which Victorians attributed to ozone. More recently, it has been determined that the chemical responsible for much of the odor in air along certain seashores is dimethyl sulfide, released by microbes.

Salts generally do not dissolve in air, but can be carried by sea spray in the form of particulate matter.

In the early 19th century, a lower prevalence of disease in coastal regions or islands was attributed to the sea air. Such medical beliefs were translated into the literature of Jane Austen and other authors.

Later that century, such beliefs led to the establishment of seaside resorts for the treatment of tuberculosis, with medical beliefs of its efficacy continuing into the 20th century. However, the quality of sea air was often degraded by pollution from wood- and coal-burning ships. Today those fuels are gone, replaced by high sulphur oil in diesel engines, which generate sulphate aerosols.

See also
 Sea spray

References

Further reading 
 Hassan, John. The Seaside, Health and Environment in England and Wales Since 1800. Ashgate Publishing.

Atmospheric chemistry
Air pollution
Oceanography

fr:Embrun marin
ko:바다 비말
ja:波飛沫
pt:Maresia